Keystone is an unincorporated community in Albany County, Wyoming, United States.

The population of Keystone was recorded as 374 in the 1930 census but declined to 169 by 1940. In 1950, Keystone had a population of 120. Keystone once featured a gold mine with a shaft 365 feet deep.

References

Unincorporated communities in Albany County, Wyoming
Unincorporated communities in Wyoming